The Moon orbits Earth in the prograde direction and completes one revolution relative to the Vernal Equinox and the stars in about 27.32 days (a tropical month and sidereal month) and one revolution relative to the Sun in about 29.53 days (a synodic month).

With a mean orbital velocity of 1.022 km/s (0.635 miles/s, 2,286 miles/h), the Moon covers a distance approximately its diameter, or about half a degree on the celestial sphere, each hour. The Moon differs from most satellites of other planets in that its orbit is close to the ecliptic plane instead of to its primary's (in this case, Earth's) equatorial plane. The Moon's orbital plane is inclined by about 5.1° with respect to the ecliptic plane, whereas the Moon's equatorial plane is tilted by only 1.5°.

Properties 
The properties of the orbit described in this section are approximations. The Moon's orbit around Earth has many variations (perturbations) due to the gravitational attraction of the Sun and planets, the study of which (lunar theory) has a long history.

Elliptic shape 
The orbit of the Moon is a nearly circular ellipse about the Earth (the semimajor and semiminor axes are 384,400 km and 383,800 km, respectively: a difference of only 0.16%). The equation of the ellipse yields an eccentricity of 0.0549 and perigee and apogee distances of 362,600 km and 405,400 km respectively (a difference of 12%).

Since nearer objects appear larger, the Moon's apparent size changes as it moves toward and away from an observer on Earth. An event referred to as a "supermoon" occurs when the full Moon is at its closest to Earth (perigee). The largest possible apparent diameter of the Moon is the same 12% larger (as perigee versus apogee distances) than the smallest; the apparent area is 25% more and so is the amount of light it reflects toward Earth.

The variance in the Moon's orbital distance corresponds with changes in its tangential and angular speeds, as stated in Kepler's second law. The mean angular movement relative to an imaginary observer at the Earth–Moon barycentre is ° per day to the east (J2000.0 epoch).

Elongation 
The Moon's elongation is its angular distance east of the Sun at any time. At new moon, it is zero and the Moon is said to be in conjunction. At full moon, the elongation is 180° and it is said to be in opposition. In both cases, the Moon is in syzygy, that is, the Sun, Moon and Earth are nearly aligned. When elongation is either 90° or 270°, the Moon is said to be in quadrature.

Precession 

The orientation of the orbit is not fixed in space but rotates over time. This orbital precession is called apsidal precession and is the rotation of the Moon's orbit within the orbital plane, i.e. the axes of the ellipse change direction. The lunar orbit's major axis – the longest diameter of the orbit, joining its nearest and farthest points, the perigee and apogee, respectively – makes one complete revolution every 8.85 Earth years, or 3,232.6054 days, as it rotates slowly in the same direction as the Moon itself (direct motion) – meaning precesses eastward by 360°. The Moon's apsidal precession is distinct from the nodal precession of its orbital plane and axial precession of the moon itself.

Inclination 

The mean inclination of the lunar orbit to the ecliptic plane is 5.145°. Theoretical considerations show that the present inclination relative to the ecliptic plane arose by tidal evolution from an earlier near-Earth orbit with a fairly constant inclination relative to Earth's equator. It would require an inclination of this earlier orbit of about 10° to the equator to produce a present inclination of 5° to the ecliptic. It is thought that originally the inclination to the equator was near zero, but it could have been increased to 10° through the influence of planetesimals passing near the Moon while falling to the Earth. If this had not happened, the Moon would now lie much closer to the ecliptic and eclipses would be much more frequent.

The rotational axis of the Moon is not perpendicular to its orbital plane, so the lunar equator is not in the plane of its orbit, but is inclined to it by a constant value of 6.688° (this is the obliquity). As was discovered by Jacques Cassini in 1722, the rotational axis of the Moon precesses with the same rate as its orbital plane, but is 180° out of phase (see Cassini's Laws). Therefore, the angle between the ecliptic and the lunar equator is always 1.543°, even though the rotational axis of the Moon is not fixed with respect to the stars. It also means that when the moon is farthest north of the ecliptic, the centre of the part we see is about 6.7° south of the lunar equator and the south pole is visible, whereas when the moon is farthest south of the ecliptic the centre of the visible part is 6.7° north of the equator and the north pole is visible. This is called libration in latitude.

Nodes 

The nodes are points at which the Moon's orbit crosses the ecliptic. The Moon crosses the same node every 27.2122 days, an interval called the draconic month or draconitic month. The line of nodes, the intersection between the two respective planes, has a retrograde motion: for an observer on Earth, it rotates westward along the ecliptic with a period of 18.6 years or 19.3549° per year. When viewed from the celestial north, the nodes move clockwise around Earth, opposite to Earth's own spin and its revolution around the Sun. An Eclipse of the Moon or Sun can occur when the nodes align with the Sun, roughly every 173.3 days. Lunar orbit inclination also determines eclipses; shadows cross when nodes coincide with full and new moon when the Sun, Earth, and Moon align in three dimensions.

In effect, this means that the "tropical year" on the Moon is only 347 days long. This is called the draconic year or eclipse year. The "seasons" on the Moon fit into this period. For about half of this draconic year, the Sun is north of the lunar equator (but at most 1.543°), and for the other half, it is south of the lunar equator. Obviously, the effect of these seasons is minor compared to the difference between lunar night and lunar day. At the lunar poles, instead of usual lunar days and nights of about 15 Earth days, the Sun will be "up" for 173 days as it will be "down"; polar sunrise and sunset takes 18 days each year. "Up" here means that the centre of the Sun is above the horizon. Lunar polar sunrises and sunsets occur around the time of eclipses (solar or lunar). For example, at the Solar eclipse of March 9, 2016, the Moon was near its descending node, and the Sun was near the point in the sky where the equator of the Moon crosses the ecliptic. When the Sun reaches that point, the centre of the Sun sets at the lunar north pole and rises at the lunar south pole.

The solar eclipse of September 1 of the same year, the Moon was near its ascending node, and the Sun was near the point in the sky where the equator of the Moon crosses the ecliptic. When the Sun reaches that point, the centre of the Sun rises at the lunar north pole and sets at the lunar south pole.

Inclination to the equator and lunar standstill

Every 18.6 years, the angle between the Moon's orbit and Earth's equator reaches a maximum of 28°36′, the sum of Earth's equatorial tilt (23°27′) and the Moon's orbital inclination (5°09′) to the ecliptic. This is called major lunar standstill. Around this time, the Moon's declination will vary from −28°36′ to +28°36′. Conversely, 9.3 years later, the angle between the Moon's orbit and Earth's equator reaches its minimum of 18°20′. This is called a minor lunar standstill. The last lunar standstill was a minor standstill in October 2015. At that time the descending node was lined up with the equinox (the point in the sky having right ascension zero and declination zero). The nodes are moving west by about 19° per year. The Sun crosses a given node about 20 days earlier each year.

When the inclination of the Moon's orbit to the Earth's equator is at its minimum of 18°20′, the centre of the Moon's disk will be above the horizon every day from latitudes less than 70°43' (90° − 18°20' – 57' parallax) north or south. When the inclination is at its maximum of 28°36', the centre of the Moon's disk will be above the horizon every day only from latitudes less than 60°27' (90° − 28°36' – 57' parallax) north or south.

At higher latitudes, there will be a period of at least one day each month when the Moon does not rise, but there will also be a period of at least one day each month when the Moon does not set. This is similar to the seasonal behaviour of the Sun, but with a period of 27.2 days instead of 365 days. Note that a point on the Moon can actually be visible when it is about 34 arc minutes below the horizon, due to atmospheric refraction.

Because of the inclination of the Moon's orbit with respect to the Earth's equator, the Moon is above the horizon at the North and South Pole for almost two weeks every month, even though the Sun is below the horizon for six months at a time. The period from moonrise to moonrise at the poles is a tropical month, about 27.3 days, quite close to the sidereal period. When the Sun is the furthest below the horizon (winter solstice), the Moon will be full when it is at its highest point. When the Moon is in Gemini it will be above the horizon at the North Pole, and when it is in Sagittarius it will be up at the South Pole.

The Moon's light is used by zooplankton in the Arctic when the Sun is below the horizon for months and must have been helpful to the animals that lived in Arctic and Antarctic regions when the climate was warmer.

Scale model

History of observations and measurements 

About 1000 BC, the Babylonians were the first human civilization known to have kept a consistent record of lunar observations. Clay tablets from that period, which have been found over the territory of present-day Iraq, are inscribed with cuneiform writing recording the times and dates of moonrises and moonsets, the stars that the Moon passed close by, and the time differences between rising and setting of both the Sun and the Moon around the time of the full moon. Babylonian astronomy discovered the three main periods of the Moon's motion and used data analysis to build lunar calendars that extended well into the future. This use of detailed, systematic observations to make predictions based on experimental data may be classified as the first scientific study in human history. However, the Babylonians seem to have lacked any geometrical or physical interpretation of their data, and they could not predict future lunar eclipses (although "warnings" were issued before likely eclipse times).

Ancient Greek astronomers were the first to introduce and analyze mathematical models of the motion of objects in the sky. Ptolemy described lunar motion by using a well-defined geometric model of epicycles and evection.

Sir Isaac Newton was the first to develop a complete theory of motion, mechanics. The observations of the lunar motion were the main test of his theory.

Lunar periods 

There are several different periods associated with the lunar orbit. The sidereal month is the time it takes to make one complete orbit around Earth with respect to the fixed stars. It is about 27.32 days. The synodic month is the time it takes the Moon to reach the same visual phase. This varies notably throughout the year, but averages around 29.53 days. The synodic period is longer than the sidereal period because the Earth–Moon system moves in its orbit around the Sun during each sidereal month, hence a longer period is required to achieve a similar alignment of Earth, the Sun, and the Moon. The anomalistic month is the time between perigees and is about 27.55 days. The Earth–Moon separation determines the strength of the lunar tide raising force.

The draconic month is the time from ascending node to ascending node. The time between two successive passes of the same ecliptic longitude is called the tropical month. The latter periods are slightly different from the sidereal month.

The average length of a calendar month (a twelfth of a year) is about 30.4 days. This is not a lunar period, though the calendar month is historically related to the visible lunar phase.

Tidal evolution 

The gravitational attraction that the Moon exerts on Earth is the cause of tides in both the ocean and the solid Earth; the Sun has a smaller tidal influence. The solid Earth responds quickly to any change in the tidal forcing, the distortion taking the form of an ellipsoid with the high points roughly beneath the Moon and on the opposite side of Earth.  This is a result of the high speed of seismic waves within the solid Earth.

However the speed of seismic waves is not infinite and, together with the effect of energy loss within the Earth, this causes a slight delay between the passage of the maximum forcing due to the Moon across and the maximum Earth tide.  As the Earth rotates faster than the Moon travels around its orbit, this small angle produces a gravitational torque which slows the Earth and accelerates the Moon in its orbit.

In the case of the ocean tides, the speed of tidal waves in the ocean is far slower than the speed of the Moon's tidal forcing.  As a result, the ocean is never in near equilibrium with the tidal forcing.  Instead, the forcing generates the long ocean waves which propagate around the ocean basins until eventually losing their energy through turbulence, either in the deep ocean or on shallow continental shelves.

Although the ocean's response is the more complex of the two, it is possible to split the ocean tides into a small ellipsoid term which affects the Moon plus a second term which has no effect.  The ocean's ellipsoid term also slows the Earth and accelerates the Moon, but because the ocean dissipates so much tidal energy, the present ocean tides have an order of magnitude greater effect than the solid Earth tides.

Because of the tidal torque, caused by the ellipsoids, some of Earth's angular (or rotational) momentum is gradually being transferred to the rotation of the Earth–Moon pair around their mutual centre of mass, called the barycentre. See tidal acceleration for a more detailed description.

This slightly greater orbital angular momentum causes the Earth–Moon distance to increase at approximately 38 millimetres per year. Conservation of angular momentum means that Earth's axial rotation is gradually slowing, and because of this its day lengthens by approximately 24 microseconds every year (excluding glacial rebound). Both figures are valid only for the current configuration of the continents.

The present high rate may be due to near resonance between natural ocean frequencies and tidal frequencies. Another explanation is that in the past the Earth rotated much faster, a day possibly lasting only 9 hours on the early Earth.  The resulting tidal waves in the ocean would have then been much shorter and it would have been more difficult for the long wavelength tidal forcing to excite the short wavelength tides.

The Moon is gradually receding from Earth into a higher orbit, and calculations suggest that this would continue for about 50 billion years. By that time, Earth and the Moon would be in a mutual spin–orbit resonance or tidal locking, in which the Moon will orbit Earth in about 47 days (currently 27 days), and both the Moon and Earth would rotate around their axes in the same time, always facing each other with the same side. This has already happened to the Moon—the same side always faces Earth—and is also slowly happening to the Earth. However, the slowdown of Earth's rotation is not occurring fast enough for the rotation to lengthen to a month before other effects change the situation: approximately 2.3 billion years from now, the increase of the Sun's radiation will have caused Earth's oceans to evaporate, removing the bulk of the tidal friction and acceleration.

Libration 

The Moon is in synchronous rotation, meaning that it keeps the same face toward Earth at all times. This synchronous rotation is only true on average because the Moon's orbit has a definite eccentricity. As a result, the angular velocity of the Moon varies as it orbits Earth and hence is not always equal to the Moon's rotational velocity which is more constant. When the Moon is at its perigee, its orbital motion is faster than its rotation. At that time the Moon is a bit ahead in its orbit with respect to its rotation about its axis, and this creates a perspective effect which allows us to see up to eight degrees of longitude of its eastern (right) far side. Conversely, when the Moon reaches its apogee, its orbital motion is slower than its rotation, revealing eight degrees of longitude of its western (left) far side. This is referred to as optical libration in longitude.

The Moon's axis of rotation is inclined by in total 6.7° relative to the normal to the plane of the ecliptic. This leads to a similar perspective effect in the north–south direction that is referred to as optical libration in latitude, which allows one to see almost 7° of latitude beyond the pole on the far side. Finally, because the Moon is only about 60 Earth radii away from Earth's centre of mass, an observer at the equator who observes the Moon throughout the night moves laterally by one Earth diameter. This gives rise to a diurnal libration, which allows one to view an additional one degree's worth of lunar longitude. For the same reason, observers at both of Earth's geographical poles would be able to see one additional degree's worth of libration in latitude.

Besides these "optical librations" caused by the change in perspective for an observer on Earth, there are also "physical librations" which are actual nutations of the direction of the pole of rotation of the Moon in space: but these are very small.

Path of Earth and Moon around Sun 

When viewed from the north celestial pole (i.e., from the approximate direction of the star Polaris) the Moon orbits Earth anticlockwise and Earth orbits the Sun anticlockwise, and the Moon and Earth rotate on their own axes anticlockwise.

The right-hand rule can be used to indicate the direction of the angular velocity. If the thumb of the right hand points to the north celestial pole, its fingers curl in the direction that the Moon orbits Earth, Earth orbits the Sun, and the Moon and Earth rotate on their own axes.

In representations of the Solar System, it is common to draw the trajectory of Earth from the point of view of the Sun, and the trajectory of the Moon from the point of view of Earth. This could give the impression that the Moon orbits Earth in such a way that sometimes it goes backwards when viewed from the Sun's perspective. However, because the orbital velocity of the Moon around Earth (1 km/s) is small compared to the orbital velocity of Earth about the Sun (30 km/s), this never happens. There are no rearward loops in the Moon's solar orbit.

This centre of gravity remains on the line between the centres of the Earth and Moon as the Earth completes its diurnal rotation. The path of the Earth–Moon system in its solar orbit is defined as the movement of this mutual centre of gravity around the Sun. Consequently, Earth's centre veers inside and outside the solar orbital path during each synodic month as the Moon moves in its orbit around the common centre of gravity.

The Sun's gravitational effect on the Moon is more than twice that of Earth's on the Moon; consequently, the Moon's trajectory is always convex (as seen when looking Sunward at the entire Sun–Earth–Moon system from a great distance outside Earth–Moon solar orbit), and is nowhere concave (from the same perspective) or looped. That is, the region enclosed by the Moon's orbit of the Sun is a convex set.

See also 

 Ernest William Brown
 Double planet
 List of orbits
 ELP2000
 Ephemeris
 Jet Propulsion Laboratory Development Ephemeris
 Lunar Laser Ranging experiment
 Milankovitch cycles
 Orbital elements

Notes

References

External links
 View of the Moon Good diagrams of Moon, Earth, tilts of orbits and axes, courtesy of U. of Arkansas

 
Articles containing video clips